"We R Are Why" is an Autechre 12-inch single released by mail-order and available at some concerts, by Warp Records in 1996. It was written and produced by Rob Brown and Sean Booth.
Sean Booth:"we r are why were the first two tracks we did on the ry30
they're both entirely done in the ry30 – with a bit of fx on the diff channels maybe, can't rem"

Track listing

There is intentionally no speed listed on the release. In an "AAA (Ask Autechre Anything)" on the site WATMM, Sean Booth stated "our original intention [was] to not write it on the record". The durations above were measured when the vinyl was played at 45 rpm.

References

External links

Autechre albums
1996 albums
Warp (record label) albums